Kent McDonell (born March 1, 1979) is a Canadian former professional ice hockey player, who last played for Rungsted Seier Capital in Denmark. He has played 32 games in the NHL with the Columbus Blue Jackets. McDonell was born and raised in Williamstown, Ontario.

Career statistics

References

External links

1979 births
Living people
AIK IF players
Canadian ice hockey right wingers
Carolina Hurricanes draft picks
Columbus Blue Jackets players
Dayton Bombers players
Detroit Red Wings draft picks
Färjestad BK players
Grand Rapids Griffins players
Guelph Storm players
Sportspeople from Cornwall, Ontario
Linköping HC players
People from the United Counties of Stormont, Dundas and Glengarry
SC Rapperswil-Jona Lakers players
Skellefteå AIK players
Syracuse Crunch players
HC TPS players
Ice hockey people from Ontario
Canadian expatriate ice hockey players in Finland
Canadian expatriate ice hockey players in Switzerland
Canadian expatriate ice hockey players in Sweden